The fawn-breasted brilliant (Heliodoxa rubinoides) is a species of hummingbird. It is native to South America, where it occurs in Bolivia, Colombia, Ecuador, and Peru.

Other common names include lilac-throated brilliant in English and brillante pechigamuza, colibrí de vientre ocre, and diamante pechigamuza in Spanish.

Taxonomy
The fawn-breasted brilliant is a member of the hummingbird family, Trochilidae.

There are 3 subspecies:
Heliodoxa rubinoides aequatorialis (Colombia and Ecuador, western slope of the Andes Mountains)
Heliodoxa rubinoides cervinigularis (Ecuador and Peru, eastern slope of the Andes)
Heliodoxa rubinoides rubinoides (Colombia, central and eastern Andes)

Description
The bird is green above and an iridescent copper on the underparts. It has areas of fawn and green and copper spotting. The beak is long and slightly curved.

Distribution and habitat
The fawn-breasted brilliant is native to the Andes, the various subspecies occupying different mountain slopes. It is somewhat uncommon, with a patchy distribution, but it is of least concern, according to the International Union for Conservation of Nature. It lives in tropical forest.

Behavior

Diet

The diet of the fawn-breasted brilliant mainly consists of nectar. It defends quality nectar flowers from other nectarivores, including insects such as bumblebees. When feeding it hovers before the flower or hangs from it, and inserts its tongue up to 13 times per second. It will also visit bird feeders and will drink water from fountains and bird baths. It takes small insects and spiders for extra protein. The female catches large quantities of insects during breeding because they are an important food for the chicks. The bird catches insect prey by hawking, picking them from plants, and plucking them from spider webs.

Breeding
The bird is only social during breeding. The male performs a courtship display by flying in U-shaped patterns before the female. There is no pair bond and the male is not involved with nesting or the rearing of the young. Both male and female mate with several partners.

The female constructs a nest in a shrub or tree. It is made of plant fibers, spider webs, animal hairs, and down, and it is lined externally with moss for camouflage. She lays a clutch of two white eggs. She regurgitates insect material for the chicks, because they cannot persist on nectar alone. She broods the chicks for about 12 days, after which there is not enough room for her in the nest. The young depart at about 20 days.

Vocalizations
The fawn-breasted brilliant makes two different vocalizations, a series of “tchik” notes and a common “swi-swi-swi-swu” call.

References

Further reading
Ridgely, R. S. and P. J. Greenfield. “Fawn-breasted Brilliant.” The Birds of Ecuador: Status, Distribution, and Taxonomy. Volume 1. 2001. pg. 363.
Ridgely, R. S. and P. J. Greenfield. “Fawn-breasted Brilliant.” The Birds of Ecuador: Field Guide. Volume 2. 2001. Plate 43, pg. 270.

fawn-breasted brilliant
Birds of the Northern Andes
fawn-breasted brilliant
fawn-breasted brilliant